Sphoeroides angusticeps, known as the narrow-headed puffer, is a species of pufferfish in the family Tetraodontidae. It is a tropical marine species endemic to the Gálapagos Islands, where it occurs at a depth range of 5 to 18 m (16 to 59 ft). It reaches 25 cm (9.8 inches) in total length. The species is thought to be diurnal, hovering just above the substrate by day and burying itself at night.

References 

Tetraodontidae